The Apostolic Nunciature to Vanuatu is an ecclesiastical office of the Catholic Church in Vanuatu. It is a diplomatic post of the Holy See, whose representative is called the Apostolic Nuncio with the rank of an ambassador. The nuncio resides in Wellington, New Zealand; the position has been vacant since 16 June 2018.

List of papal representatives to Vanuatu 
Apostolic Nuncios
Patrick Coveney (15 October 1996 – 25 January 2005)
Charles Daniel Balvo (1 April 2006 – 17 January 2013)
Martin Krebs (23 September 2013 – 16 June 2018)

References

Vanuatu